Tardequeia was a settlement and station (mutatio) of ancient Cilicia, on the road between Adana and Issus, inhabited during Byzantine times. 

Its site is tentatively located near Kurtkulağı in Asiatic Turkey.

References

Populated places in ancient Cilicia
Former populated places in Turkey
Populated places of the Byzantine Empire
History of Adana Province